Victor J. Ghezzi (October 19, 1910 – May 30, 1976) was an American professional golfer. (Birth year sometimes listed as 1911 or 1912)

Early life 
Born in Rumson, New Jersey.

Professional career 
Ghezzi won 11 times on the PGA Tour, including one major title, the 1941 PGA Championship, where he defeated Byron Nelson in 38 holes in the finals. He was selected for three Ryder Cup teams, 1939, 1941, and 1943, but each was canceled due to World War II. During the war, Ghezzi enlisted in the U.S. Army and began his training in early 1942.

At the U.S. Open in 1946, he was in an 18-hole Sunday morning playoff with Lloyd Mangrum and Nelson. It ended in a three-way tie, forcing another 18 holes. Mangrum won that afternoon round by a single stroke over both Ghezzi and Nelson.

Ghezzi was elected to the PGA of America's hall of fame in 1965. He died of cancer at age 65 the Miami Heart Institute in Miami Beach, Florida.

Professional wins (17)

PGA Tour wins (11)
1935 (2) Los Angeles Open, Calvert Open
1936 (2) Hollywood Open, New Jersey PGA Championship
1937 (1) Lake Placid Open
1938 (3) North and South Open, Inverness Invitational Four-Ball (with Sam Snead), Hershey Four-Ball (with Ben Hogan)
1941 (1) PGA Championship
1947 (1) Greater Greensboro Open
1948 (1) Dapper Dan-Alcoma Tournament
Major championship is shown on bold.

Other wins (6)
this list may be incomplete
1935 Maryland Open
1937 New Jersey State Open
1939 New Jersey PGA Championship
1943 New Jersey State Open
1944 New Jersey State Open
1949 New Jersey PGA Championship

Major championships

Wins (1)

Note: The PGA Championship was match play until 1958

Results timeline

NYF = tournament not yet founded
NT = no tournament
WD = withdrew
CUT = missed the half-way cut
R128, R64, R32, R16, QF, SF = round in which player lost in PGA Championship match play
"T" indicates a tie for a place

Summary

Most consecutive cuts made – 36 (1934 PGA – 1950 PGA)
Longest streak of top-10s – 3 (1936 PGA – 1937 PGA)

See also
List of men's major championships winning golfers

References

External links
New York Historical Society: sports   Vic Ghezzi
PGA of America: Golf Professional Hall of Fame member profiles 
New Jersey State Golf Association   When Deal's Ghezzi beat Nelson in playoff for PGA title

American male golfers
PGA Tour golfers
Winners of men's major golf championships
Golfers from New Jersey
Golfers from Miami
United States Army personnel of World War II
Deaths from cancer in Florida
People from Rumson, New Jersey
People from Teaneck, New Jersey
1910 births
1976 deaths